Polytechnic is most commonly used to refer to schools, colleges, or universities that qualify as an institute of technology or vocational university also sometimes called universities of applied sciences.

Polytechnic may also refer to:

Education

Tertiary education
 Bahrain Polytechnic, in Isa Town
 Polytechnic (Greece), schools that teach engineering
 Polytechnic (Portugal), schools that offer practical training, profession-oriented
 Polytechnic School (France), Paris
 Polytechnic University (New York), New York University Tandon School of Engineering
 Polytechnic (United Kingdom) ("poly" for short), a type of vocationally-focused and teaching-heavy higher education institution with university status between 1965 and 1992, later merged into the university system in 1992 and thus now sometimes known as a "Post-1992 university"
 Polytechnic (Singapore), tertiary institutions in Singapore
 Jakarta State Polytechnic, Indonesia
 Tokyo Polytechnic University, Japan
 Hong Kong Polytechnic University (may be abbreviated as PolyU)
 Polytechnic University of Catalonia, or BarcelonaTech, Spain
 Rensselaer Polytechnic Institute, Troy, New York
 Polytechnic University of the Philippines
 Wuhan Polytechnic University
 Macao Polytechnic University
 Florida Polytechnic University, of Lakeland, Florida
 Virginia Polytechnic, of Blacksburg, Virginia
 Politechnika Wrocławska, Wrocław, Poland

Secondary education
 Polytechnic High School (disambiguation)
 Polytechnic Secondary School

Entertainment 
 Polytechnique (film), a 2009 Canadian film
 Polytechnic (film), a 2014 Indian film
 Polytechnic (band), an English indie rock band

Sports 
 Polytechnic F.C., an English football club 
 Polytechnic Boxing Club, an English boxing club
 Kingston Athletic Club and Polytechnic Harriers, English sporting clubs
 Polytechnic Marathon, an English foot race
 Polytechnic Stadium (London), an English sports facility
 Polytechnic Magazine, magazine covering news for the Regent Street Polytechnic 
 Polytechnic Stadium (Kremenchuk), a Ukrainian sports facility

See also
 
 List of institutions using the term "institute of technology" or "polytechnic"
 VEB Polytechnik, a defunct East German (GDR) company